The 2012–13 Montana State Bobcats men's basketball team represented Montana State University during the 2012–13 NCAA Division I men's basketball season. The Bobcats, led by seventh year head coach Brad Huse, played their home games at Worthington Arena and were members of the Big Sky Conference. They finished the season 13–17, 10–10 in Big Sky play to finish in a tie for fourth place. They lost in the quarterfinals of the Big Sky tournament where they lost to Northern Colorado.

Roster

Schedule

|-
!colspan=9| Exhibition

|-
!colspan=9| Regular season

|-
!colspan=9| 2013 Big Sky Conference men's basketball tournament

References

Montana State Bobcats men's basketball seasons
Montana State
Montana State Bobcats men's basketball
Montana State Bobcats men's basketball